Archery at the Friendship Games was held in Plzeň, Czechoslovakia between 23 and 26 August 1984. Two events were contested: men's individual (with 23 competitors) and women's individual (with 20 competitors).

Soviet Union won 5 out of 6 possible medals.

Medal summary

Medal table

See also
 Archery at the 1984 Summer Olympics

References

Friendship Games
Friendship Games
1984 in Czechoslovak sport
Friendship Games